The Acts of Andrew and Bartholomew is a 5th-century Nestorian text written in Koine Greek which is one of many apocryphal acts of the apostles. The work was influential on later Christian hagiographies of Saint Mercurius and Saint Christopher, as well as medieval Islamic traditions.

Published editions

English 
 
  Translated from Ethiopic.

Ethiopic

See also 
 Cynocephaly

Citations

References

Further reading 

 
 
 

5th-century Christian texts
Apocryphal Acts
Nestorian texts
Texts in Koine Greek